Dhandhuka was a Lok Sabha parliamentary constituency in Ahmedabad district of Gujarat, India. With the implementation of the delimitation of parliamentary constituencies in 2008, it ceased to exist.

Members of Parliament
1952-66: Constituency does not exist
1967: R.K. Amin, Swatantra Party
1971: H. M. Patel, Swatantra Party
1977: Natverlal Parmar, Janata Party
1980: Narsingh Makwana, Indian National Congress
1984: Narsingh Makwana, Indian National Congress
1989: Ratilal Varma, Bharatiya Janata Party
1991: Ratilal Varma, Bharatiya Janata Party
1996: Ratilal Varma, Bharatiya Janata Party
1998: Ratilal Varma, Bharatiya Janata Party
1999: Ratilal Varma, Bharatiya Janata Party
2004: Ratilal Varma, Bharatiya Janata Party
2008 onwards: Constituency does not exist

See also
 Dhandhuka
 List of Constituencies of the Lok Sabha

Ahmedabad district
Former Lok Sabha constituencies of Gujarat
Former constituencies of the Lok Sabha
2008 disestablishments in India
Constituencies disestablished in 2008